Charlotte's Web is a 1952 children's book by E. B. White.

Charlotte's Web may also refer to:

 Charlotte's Web (1973 film), an animated musical adaptation of the book with songs by the Sherman Brothers
 "Charlotte's Web" (song), 1980, by The Statler Brothers
 Charlotte's Web (band), a Western Australian indie pop band
 Charlotte's Web 2: Wilbur's Great Adventure, a 2003 direct-to-video sequel to the 1973 film
 Charlotte's Web (2006 film), a live-action adaptation of the book
 Charlotte's Web (video game), based on this film
 Charlotte's Web (musical), a stage musical  based on the book by E. B. White.
 Charlotte's web (cannabis), a cannabis extract
 Charlotte's Web (Pretty Little Liars), an episode of the TV series Pretty Little Liars